John Simmit (born 13 December 1963) is a British actor and stand-up comedian, best known for playing Dipsy in BBC TV's global hit Teletubbies from 1997–2001.

Career
His many other TV credits include The Real McCoy, The Gadget Show and The Big Fat Quiz of the '90s, whilst live he has performed internationally from Bahrain to Budapest.

As a producer through Upfront Comedy he has put comedy shows into UK theatres nationwide for 25 years, including two major shows in London's west End, in New York & North Carolina. Previewing Upfront's 10th anniversary show, The Guardian noted, "[T]his anniversary show is yet another excellent standup bill from the most enterprising black comedy promoters in the country. Upfront's first Croydon gig featured Felix Dexter (the first black comic to become a regular performer at Jongleurs and the Comedy Store), plus lapsed Pentecostal choir boy Junior Simpson and Nigerian cockney Gina Yashere. Also on that first bill was the brains behind Upfront, John Simmit […] Thanks to pioneering outfits like Upfront, Britain's black comics are getting some of the mainstream exposure that their talents deserve - and now a growing number of African-American standups are coming here to gig alongside them".

Filmography
The Real McCoy (1994) - Guest
Teletubbies (1997–2001) - Dipsy 
Teletubbies Everywhere (2002) - Dipsy
Today (2007) - guest (as Dipsy and himself)
The Paul O'Grady Show (2009) - guest (as Dipsy)
The Big Fat Quiz of the '90s (2012) - Himself
Respect: A Felix Dexter Special (2013) - Himself
The Gadget Show (2014) - Himself
Pikachu & Friends - Charmander
Stitch's Hawaiian Paradise - Stitch

References

External links
 

1963 births
Living people
20th-century British male actors
21st-century British male actors
Black British male actors
British male comedians
British male television actors
Male actors from Birmingham, West Midlands